FC Spartak Shchyolkovo is a Russian football club from Shchyolkovo, founded in 1992. It first played on the professional level in 1993. It came second in the division twice, just missing the promotion into the Russian First Division, in 1998 and 1999. In 2009, it was playing in the Russian Second Division, but on July 17 the team resigned from the Division (due to financial strait) after playing 18 games.

External links

Association football clubs established in 1992
Football clubs in Russia
Football in Moscow Oblast
1992 establishments in Russia